A melanoblast is a precursor cell of a melanocyte. These cells migrate from the trunk neural crest cells (in terms of axial level from neck to posterior end) dorsolaterally between the ectoderm and dorsal surface of the somites.

See also 
Biological pigment
List of human cell types derived from the germ layers

References 

 
Pigments
Biomolecules
Pigmentation